Ambotey is a village between Daramdin and Sombaria in West District of Sikkim. Several schools are located in or near Ambotey.

References

Villages in Gyalshing district